Aleksandr Viktorovich Varlamov (born July 18, 1979) is Russian diver who, along with Igor Lukashin, won the bronze medal at the 1998 World Aquatics Championships in the men's 10 m platform synchronized event. He represented Belarus at the 2004 Summer Olympics in Athens, Greece.

References
 

1979 births
Living people
Belarusian male divers
Russian male divers
Olympic divers of Belarus
Divers at the 2004 Summer Olympics
Divers at the 2008 Summer Olympics
World Aquatics Championships medalists in diving
Sportspeople from Voronezh